Philippe Goldberg (born 10 May 1979) is a Belgian former field hockey player. He competed in the men's tournament at the 2008 Summer Olympics.

References

External links
 

1979 births
Living people
Belgian male field hockey players
Olympic field hockey players of Belgium
Field hockey players at the 2008 Summer Olympics
People from Etterbeek
Field hockey players from Brussels